Drag strip (or Dragstrip) may refer to:

Dragstrip, track used for drag racing
Drag Strip (Transformers), Transformer character who is one of the Stunticons
Videocart-9: Drag Strip, drag racing videogame released in 1976

See also
Dover Drag Strip
Lions Drag Strip
Hilo Dragstrip